The 1964 season of the Mitropa Cup football club tournament was won by Spartak Praha Sokolovo who defeated Slovan Bratislava 2–0 on aggregate in the final. It was the club's third victory in the competition, having previously won it in 1927 and 1935.

Quarter-finals
The matches took place on 17 and 20 June.

|}

Semi-finals
The matches took place on 24 June and 1 July.

|}

Finals
The matches took place on 5 August and 2 September.

|}

External links

References

1964
1963–64 in European football
1964–65 in European football
1963–64 in Hungarian football
1964–65 in Hungarian football
1963–64 in Yugoslav football
1964–65 in Yugoslav football
1963–64 in Austrian football
1964–65 in Austrian football
1963–64 in Czechoslovak football
1964–65 in Czechoslovak football
1963–64 in Italian football
1964–65 in Italian football